Bluebell is a British television drama series produced by the BBC in 1986.

The series was set before and during the Second World War and was based around a dance troupe performing in Europe. The drama series was based on Margaret Kelly Leibovici and her dance troupe named the Bluebell Girls. Margaret Kelly is often referred to as Miss Bluebell.

Cast
Carolyn Pickles as Margaret Kelly
Annie Lambert as Helen
Philip Sayer as Marcel Leibovici
Michael Harbour as Paul Derval 
Carmel McSharry as Aunt Mary

External links
 

BBC television dramas
World War II television drama series
1986 British television series debuts
1986 British television series endings
1980s British drama television series
English-language television shows